The Robbins & Appleton Building is a historic building at 1–5 Bond Street between Broadway and Lafayette Street in the NoHo neighborhood of Manhattan in New York City. Built in 1879–1880, it was designed by architect Stephen Decatur Hatch in the Second Empire style. The building features an ornate cast iron facade and mansard roof; it was originally used for the manufacture of watch cases and by publisher D. Appleton & Company. It was converted in 1986 to residential use. The building next door, at 7-9 Bond Street, is an inferior imitation of its neighbor.

The building was designated a New York City landmark in 1979, and was added to the National Register of Historic Places in 1982.

See also
 Appleton Building
 List of New York City Designated Landmarks in Manhattan below 14th Street
 National Register of Historic Places listings in Manhattan below 14th Street

References
Notes

External links
 

 

Buildings and structures on the National Register of Historic Places in Manhattan
Cast-iron architecture in New York City
Industrial buildings and structures on the National Register of Historic Places in New York City
Industrial buildings completed in 1879
New York City Designated Landmarks in Manhattan
Residential buildings in Manhattan
Second Empire architecture in New York City
1879 establishments in New York (state)